Glasser is a surname. Notable people with the surname include:

 Albert Glasser (1916–1998), American composer of film scores
 Arthur Glasser (1914–2009), American missiologist and missionary
 Bernard Glasser (1924–2014), American film producer and director
 Dick Glasser (1933–2000), American singer and songwriter
 Harold Glasser (1905–1992), New Deal economist and Soviet spy
 Ira Glasser (born 1938), director of the ACLU
 Isabel Glasser (born 1958), American actress
 Leah Blatt Glasser, American literary critic and scholar
 Leonard Glasser, American screenwriter, cartoonist and animator
 Mitch Glasser (born 1989), American-Israeli baseball player
 Phillip Glasser (born 1978), American actor
 Ralph Glasser (1916–2002), Scottish psychologist, economist and author
 Roland Glasser (born 1973), British literary translator
 Ronald J. Glasser, American doctor and author
 Susan Glasser (born 1969), American journalist and editor
 William Glasser (1925–2013), American psychiatrist

See also
 Glasser (musician), American musician
 Glasser effect
 Surfboard shaper, one who applies fiberglass to a surfboard blank

German-language surnames